Shepetivka is a city located on the Huska River in Khmelnytskyi Oblast (province) in western Ukraine. Shepetivka is the administrative center of Shepetivka Raion (district). It hosts the administration of Shepetivka urban hromada, one of the hromadas of Ukraine. Population: 

Shepetivka is an important railway junction with five intersecting transit routes. It is located 100 km away from Khmelnytskyi, the oblast's capital.

The city is located near historic city of Izyaslav, the center of Ruthenian Zasławski princely estate.

History

A settlement called Shepetovka, belonging to the prince Ivan Zaslavsky, was first mentioned in a written document in 1594. In the 16th century Shepetivka didn't differ from other settlements of Volhynia. The settlement had a community and a windmill. It was given Magdeburg Rights at the end of the 16th century. This contributed the settlement's expansion and growing population. At the turn of the 16th and 17th centuries, the peasantry was intensively enslaved. Population of Shepetivka also suffered from frequent attacks of the Crimean Tatars. Peasants and craftsmen responded to the feudal oppression with the revolt in 1591-1593, led by Krzysztof Kosiński, and the revolt in 1594-1596, led by Severyn Nalyvaiko. When during the Ukrainian war of liberation from Poland in July 1648, peasant-Cossack regiments of Maxym Kryvonis had conquered Polonne, the inhabitants of Shepetivka joined the troops.

At the end of the 17th century, Shepetivka became property of Lubomirski family, and in 1703, of the Sanguszko family. And at the end of the 18th century, it became part of Iziaslav county, Volhynian Governorate. In 1866, Shepetivka became the capital of the county.

The first written mention of Shepetivka was in 1594.

In 1795 it became part of Iziaslav County, Volhynian Governorate. The first railway station was built in 1873.

In 1923, it got the status of a town, becoming the capital of Shepetovka district.
In 1932 it became the capital of Shepetivka Raion, Vinnytsia Oblast.
In 1937 Shepetivka Raion became part of Kamianets-Podilskyi (since 1954 Khmelnytskyi) Oblast.
In 1991, Ukraine became an independent state, and Shepetovka became part of the state (and the town name took on the Ukrainian variant of "Shepetivka").

Shepetovka was a town with extensive settlement by Jews, similar to the surrounding region. There were 20,000 Jews counted in a census in the late 1670s, and 52,000 in the 1760s. Several important rabbis were active in the region in the 1700s, including Rabbi Pinchas Shapira, who is buried in Shepetovka. Significant emigration from Shepetovka occurred between 1880 and 1925.

During World War II, the Jewish population of Shepetovka was decimated. Hundreds of people were executed over the summer of 1941, and thousands more in the summer of 1942. Some Jews were evacuated to Uzbekistan and survived the war.

Until 18 July 2020, Shepetivka was incorporated as a city of oblast significance and served as the administrative center of Shepetivka Raion though it did not belong to the raion. In July 2020, as part of the administrative reform of Ukraine, which reduced the number of raions of Khmelnytskyi Oblast to three, the city of Shepetivka was merged into Shepetivka Raion.

Climate

Local media 
There are several media types represented in Shepetivka:

 newspapers
 Shepetivsky Visnyk is a city district publication (founders - Shepetivka city and district councils, RSA, the editorial staff of the newspaper); circulation is up to 7800 copies per week; comes out twice a week
 Denʹ za dnem is a regional information-analytical weekly; weekly circulation — 7600 copies

 TV
 TV and Radio Company LLC Like TV (former Chance)

 radio
 editorial office of the city district radio broadcasting

Notable residents
Valentina Matviyenko, governor of Saint Petersburg, was born in Shepetivka
Ignacy Jan Paderewski, pianist, composer, and Polish prime minister, lived near Shepetivka as a child
Nikolai Ostrovsky, Soviet writer, the author How the Steel Was Tempered, lived here during his childhood and adolescent years
Rabbis Pinchas of Korets lived about 30 miles from Shepetivka, but died and is buried in Shepetivka.
Rabbi Simcha Sheps, Rosh Yeshiva of Yeshiva Torah Vodaas grew up in Shepetivka (according to the Torah Vodaas Haggadah)
Sergiy Klimovych, Hero of Soviet Union., was born and died in Shepetivka
Valentin Kotyk, the youngest-ever Hero of Soviet Union.
Aizik Vaiman, notable orientalist.

Gallery

References

External links
 The murder of the Jews of Shepetivka during World War II, at Yad Vashem website.
Shepetivsky Visnyk website
Denʹ za dnem official website
Like TV website 

 
Cities in Khmelnytskyi Oblast
Volhynian Governorate
Shtetls
Cities of regional significance in Ukraine
Populated places established in 1594
Holocaust locations in Ukraine